The OnePlus Ace is a series of Android-based smartphones manufactured by OnePlus. OnePlus Ace was unveiled on April 21, 2022, OnePlus Ace Pro was unveiled on August 9, 2022, and OnePlus Ace Racing was unveiled on May 17, 2022.

References 

OnePlus mobile phones
Phablets
Android (operating system) devices
Mobile phones introduced in 2022
Mobile phones with multiple rear cameras
Mobile phones with 4K video recording